Lou Reiffel (5 November 1910 – 16 November 1977) was an Australian rules footballer who played with Melbourne and South Melbourne in the Victorian Football League (VFL).

Reiffel played in two premierships for Ballarat Imperials, before he started his VFL career in 1936, as a 25-year-old. He kicked at least one goal in all of his 16 appearances in 1936, including two finals, finishing the year with 31 goals. The following season, in round 16, he kicked a career best eight goals against Collingwood.

During the 1939 VFL season he made the decision to switch clubs, costing him a chance of playing in Melbourne's premiership win that year. He spent three seasons with South Melbourne and was their leading goal-kicker in 1940 when he kicked 33 goals.

He was the father of Richmond player Ron Reiffel and grandfather of Australian Test cricketer Paul Reiffel.

References

1910 births
Australian rules footballers from Victoria (Australia)
Melbourne Football Club players
Sydney Swans players
Ballarat Imperial Football Club players
1977 deaths